Clarence Clough Buel (July 29, 1850 in Laona, New York – May 22, 1933 in Sleepy Hollow, New York) was a United States editor and author, most notable for his work with Robert Underwood Johnson to produce the 1887 book Battles and Leaders of the Civil War and its predecessors.

Biography
Buel was connected with the New York Tribune from 1875 to 1881, when he joined the staff of Century Magazine, and, in 1883, in conjunction with Robert Underwood Johnson, began the editing of the Century articles on the American Civil War. These articles were afterward expanded and compiled into the book Battles and Leaders of the Civil War (1887). He was associate editor of Century Magazine 1909-13, advisory editor until May 1914.

Notes

References

External links
 

1850 births
1933 deaths
American editors
19th-century American writers
People from Chautauqua County, New York
Writers from New York (state)
New-York Tribune personnel
Journalists from New York (state)